Anthony John Biddle  (born 18 June 1975) is an Australian Paralympic tandem cyclist and athlete. He was born in the New South Wales city of Gosford. He competed in athletics without winning any medals at the 1996 Atlanta Games and the 2000 Sydney Games. At the 2004 Athens Games, he switched to cycling and won a gold medal in the Men's 1 km Time Trial Tandem B1–3 event, for which he received a Medal of the Order of Australia, and a bronze medal in the Men's Sprint Tandem B1–3 event. Kial Stewart was his pilot for both events.

References

External links
Anthony Biddle – Athletics Australia Results

Paralympic athletes of Australia
Paralympic cyclists of Australia
Athletes (track and field) at the 1996 Summer Paralympics
Athletes (track and field) at the 2000 Summer Paralympics
Cyclists at the 2004 Summer Paralympics
Medalists at the 2004 Summer Paralympics
Paralympic gold medalists for Australia
Paralympic bronze medalists for Australia
Visually impaired high jumpers
Australian blind people
Recipients of the Medal of the Order of Australia
People from Gosford
1975 births
Living people
ACT Academy of Sport alumni
Australian male cyclists
Paralympic medalists in cycling
Sportsmen from New South Wales
Australian pentathletes
Australian male high jumpers